Palmer D. Farrington (April 20, 1918 – November 20, 1996) was an American politician who served in the New York State Assembly from Nassau's 6th district from 1955 to 1961.

References

1918 births
1996 deaths
Republican Party members of the New York State Assembly
20th-century American politicians
Politicians from Queens, New York